Brodo Di Cagne Strategico (translated: Strategic Bitches Brew) is an EP by the Italian experimental rock band Starfuckers, released in 1991.

Track list
From Discogs.
 Saturazione
 Freddo cancro bianco
 Calma piatta
 Conseguenze
 Saturazione pt. II
 Strategie operative

Line up
Manuele Giannini: voice, guitar, amplifiers, turntables

Roberto Bertacchini: drums

Gianni Ginesi: guitar, amplifier

Gianfranco Verdaschi: guitar, amplifier

Paolo Casini: bass (2)

Mauro Vasoli: bass (1-4-6)

Paolo Vasoli: saxophones (2-3-4-5-6)

References

1991 albums
Starfuckers albums